Lists of Star Wars cast members cover cast members of productions by Star Wars, an American media franchise centered on a series of science fiction films. The lists include cast members of feature films, television series and television films.

Feature films
 Film actors, cast and characters that have appeared in Star Wars films

Television series
 Television series actors, cast and characters that have appeared in Star Wars television series
 Droids cast and characters, cast and characters that have appeared on the Droids television series
 Ewoks cast and characters, cast and characters that have appeared on the Ewoks television series
 Clone Wars cast and characters, cast and characters that have appeared on Clone Wars television series
 The Clone Wars cast and characters, cast and characters that have appeared on The Clone Wars television series
 Rebels cast and characters, cast and characters that have appeared on the Rebels television series
 Forces of Destiny cast and characters, cast and characters that have appeared on the Forces of Destiny television series
 Resistance cast and characters, cast and characters that have appeared on the Resistance television series
 The Mandalorian cast and characters, cast and characters that have appeared on The Mandalorian television series
 The Book of Boba Fett cast and characters, cast and characters that have appeared on The Book of Boba Fett television series
 Obi-Wan Kenobi cast and characters, cast and characters that have appeared on the Obi-Wan Kenobi television series
 Andor cast and characters, cast and characters that have appeared on the Andor television series
 Ahsoka cast and characters, cast and characters that have appeared on the Ahsoka television series

Television films
 Star Wars Holiday Special cast and characters, cast and characters that have appeared on the Star Wars Holiday Special television film
 Caravan of Courage: An Ewok Adventure cast and characters, cast and characters that have appeared on the Caravan of Courage: An Ewok Adventure television film
 Ewoks: The Battle for Endor cast and characters, cast and characters that have appeared on the Ewoks: The Battle for Endor television film

See also
 List of Star Wars characters
 List of Star Wars Legends characters

Lists of actors by film series
Lists of actors by science fiction television series
Cast members